Pròiseact nan Ealan is the Scottish Gaelic arts agency. It was set up in 1987 for the development of the Scottish Gaelic arts. Based in Stornoway, Isle of Lewis it is a not for profit limited company and charity. Its projects have won many awards including foreign film festivals and its best known project is An Leabhar Mòr.

External links
Official Site

Arts in Scotland
Scottish Gaelic language
Arts organisations based in Scotland
Arts organizations established in 1987
1987 establishments in Scotland